Parliamentary elections were held in Haiti on 6 April 1997 for one-third of the seats in the Senate and two seats in the Chamber of Deputies. A total of 45 candidates from 15 parties (including 25 independents) contested the Senate elections.

Only two candidates were elected in the first round, which was marked by a very low turnout. The second round was indefinitely postponed by the Provisional Electoral Council on 21 May due to international pressure from the Organisation of American States and threats of a boycott by the ruling Fanmi Lavalas, which claimed there had been fraud in the first round.

References

Elections in Haiti
1997 in Haiti
Haiti
Cancelled elections
Election and referendum articles with incomplete results